ပြည်တက္ကသိုလ်

Pyay University or the University of Pyay is a university located in Pyay, in the Bago Region of Myanmar. Pyay University was founded as a Colledge.In November 11, 1999, it was opened as a university. It stands as solely University for the students of 14 townships in West Bago Region.
 It offers Bachelor of Arts (BA) and Bachelor of Science (BSC) programs, as well as Master of Art (MA) and Master of Science (MSc).

For Ph.D degrees, students must learn in University of Yangon.

References

Universities and colleges in Bago Region
Arts and Science universities in Myanmar
Universities and colleges in Myanmar